David L. Lindsey (born August 16, 1931) is a politician in the American state of Florida. He served in the Florida House of Representatives from 1967 to 1970, representing the 41st district.

References

1931 births
Living people
20th-century American politicians
Republican Party members of the Florida House of Representatives
Politicians from Pittsburgh
People from Orlando, Florida